Quarter 95 is a public square in the city of Kryvyi Rih in Ukraine.

The quarter is located in the center of the city, on the left bank of Saksahan river, divided between the Saksahan District and the Metallurgical District.

It contains a major shopping and entertainment center of the city, located around the roundabout which is a busy meeting place and a tourist attraction in its own right. It is particularly known as place of public discussions, street artists, for its video display and neon signs mounted on the corner building on the northern side.

The Kvartal 95 Studio television production company confounded by now President of Ukraine Volodymyr Zelensky, a native of Kryvyi Rih, is named after the area.

Transport

The Budynok Rad station of the Kryvyi Rih Metrotram on the southeastern side of the quarter.

Location and sights

Major shops
McDonald's restaurant is popular with tourists and citizens. 
ATB-Market is a major retailer located on the corner of the roundabout, next to a French cafe. Adidas is a major retailer of sporting goods. It moved to its present site in 2010, and they regularly offer sale items, including international football jerseys up to 90% off.
Ukrposhta, Kyivstar, Raiffeisen Bank, Vodafone offices are often considered to be part of the business area.

Demonstrations
The Square's status as a high-profile public space has made it the destination for numerous political demonstrations, including the Euromaidan and Memorial board to the Heroes of Russo-Ukrainian War.

References

Busking venues
Streets in Kryvyi Rih
Tourist attractions in Kryvyi Rih